ENL may refer to:
 East Northumberland League, a defunct English football league
 Enfield Lock railway station, in London
 English National League, a defunct ice hockey league
 Enlhet language
 Enterolactone
 Estonian Young Socialist League, a defunct Estonian youth organisation
 Europe of Nations and Freedom, a political group in the European Parliament
 English as a New Language, the use or study of English by speakers of other languages